Catocala grynea, the woody underwing, is a moth of the family Erebidae. The species was first described by Pieter Cramer in 1780. It is found in North America from Ontario and Quebec through Maine and Connecticut, south to Florida, west to Texas and north through Iowa to Wisconsin and Minnesota.

The wingspan is 40–50 mm. Adults are on wing from May to September depending on the location. There is probably one generation per year.

The larvae feed on Crataegus, Prunus and Malus.

References

External links
Species info

grynea
Moths of North America
Moths described in 1780